The Populars for Prodi was an electoral list of political parties in Italy.

The list participated in the 1996 general election as a component of The Olive Tree, supporting Romano Prodi as candidate for Prime Minister. The list, contested seats for the Chamber of Deputies, receiving 6.8% of the vote and 72 deputies (including Prodi).

Composition
The alliance was composed of the following four parties:

Electoral results

Italian Parliament

References

1996 establishments in Italy
Defunct political party alliances in Italy
Catholic political parties
Centrist parties in Italy
Christian democratic parties in Italy
Defunct Christian political parties
Romano Prodi